The 2021 Big Ten women's soccer tournament was the postseason women's soccer tournament for the Big Ten Conference for the 2021 season held from October 31 to November 7, 2021. The seven-match tournament took place at the home side of the higher seeded team and teams were seeded based on regular season conference play. Michigan won the title by defeating Rutgers 1–0 in the final.   As the tournament champion, Michigan earned the Big Ten Conference's automatic berth into the 2021 NCAA Division I Women's Soccer Tournament.  This was the third overall title for Michigan and first for head coach Jennifer Klein.

Seeding 
Eight Big Ten schools participated in the tournament. Teams were seeded by conference record.  A tiebreaker was required to determine which school would host a Quarterfinal between Michigan State and Iowa as both teams finished the regular season with 16 points.  Michigan State won the tiebreaker by virtue of their 2–1 victory at Iowa on October 23.

Bracket

Schedule

Quarterfinals

Semifinals

Final

Statistics

Goalscorers

All-Tournament team

References

External links 
 Big Ten Conference Women's Soccer
 Big Ten Women's Soccer Tournament Central

Big Ten Women's Soccer Tournament